Martin "Buggsy" Goldstein ( – June 12, 1941) was a member of a gang of hitmen, operating out of Brooklyn, New York in the 1930s, known as Murder, Inc.

Born Meyer Goldstein, Goldstein grew up in East New York, Brooklyn, New York, and initially led the crime syndicate Murder, Inc. together with Abe "Kid Twist" Reles. Goldstein later committed murders under the orders of Lepke Buchalter and Albert "Mad Hatter" Anastasia.

Around midnight on June 12, 1941, Goldstein and Harry Strauss were executed by electric chair at Sing Sing prison.

See also
 Capital punishment in New York (state)
 Capital punishment in the United States
 List of people executed in New York

External links

1900s births
1941 deaths
20th-century executions by New York (state)
20th-century executions of American people
Criminals from Brooklyn
Executed gangsters
Executed people from New York (state)
Jewish American gangsters
Mafia hitmen
Murder, Inc.
People executed by New York (state) by electric chair
American people executed for murder
People from East New York, Brooklyn
20th-century American Jews
Inmates of Sing Sing